The S-M-J Maverick I is an American aircraft designed for homebuilt construction.

Design and development
The S-M-J Maverick I is a single-seat, open cockpit, single-engine aircraft with a strut-braced low wing and conventional landing gear. The fuselage is of wood construction and the wing is aluminium.

Specifications (Maverick I)

See also

References

Homebuilt aircraft